The Sexual Offences (Amendment) Act 1992 (c. 34) is an Act of the Parliament of the United Kingdom.

The Act provides for the lifelong anonymity of the victims and alleged victims of sexual offences, by prohibiting the publishing or broadcast of their identity, or information that might make their identity apparent, including their address or picture.

Section 1 of the Act establishes the prohibition. Section 2 sets out the sexual offences covered, and has been amended since, including due to the wholesale redefinition of sexual offences in England and Wales by the Sexual Offences Act 2003. Section 3 allows judges to waive anonymity on application from defendants and appellants if this is needed to help witnesses come forward or to avoid prejudicing their case, or if it is in the public interest. This provision is very rarely used, though some victims waive their own anonymity to talk publicly about their cases.

The Act was passed to address perceived deficiencies in an earlier and weaker form of identity protection for victims in cases of rape only, which had been established by the Sexual Offences (Amendment) Act 1976. Convictions under the Act, generally resulting in fines, occur with some frequency, especially in high-profile cases where members of the public less familiar with the law than the press or broadcast media name accusers on social media, though charges are also brought against professional journalists. In some cases, such as where abuse has taken place within a family, the media may be unable to report the name of the offender, because this combined with details of the offence may indirectly reveal the identity of the victim.

Application to Scotland

While the 1992 Act does apply in Scotland, prohibiting Scottish publishers from identifying complainants in sexual offence prosecutions which take place in England, Wales or Northern Ireland, it does not apply to sexual offence prosecutions which take in Scottish courts. While there is a media convention that Scottish complainers are not identitied, doing so is not currently prohibited by law unless an order is made imposing reporting restrictions under section 11 of the Contempt of Court Act 1981.

References

External links

The Sexual Offences (Amendment) Act 1992, as amended, from the National Archives
The Sexual Offences (Amendment) Act 1992, as originally enacted

United Kingdom Acts of Parliament 1992
Sex crimes in the United Kingdom